Matej Franko (born 14 February 2001) is a Slovak footballer who plays for Dukla Banská Bystrica as a forward.

Club career
Franko made his Fortuna Liga debut for Nitra against Ružomberok on 22 August 2020 in a 1:1 home tie. He came on as a late second half replacement for Marián Chobot.

References

External links
 FC Nitra official club profile 
 Futbalnet profile 
 
 

2001 births
Living people
People from Galanta
Sportspeople from the Trnava Region
Slovak footballers
Slovakia youth international footballers
Association football forwards
FC Nitra players
MFK Dukla Banská Bystrica players
Slovak Super Liga players